Fen Alder Carr is a 1.7 hectare Local Nature Reserve south-east of Creeting St Peter in Suffolk. It is owned by Suffolk County Council.

This site has diverse habitats, including open water, alder carr woodland and tall fen. There is a large rookery high in the trees, and there are other birds such as siskins, chaffinches and redpolls.

There is access from Fen Lane.

References

Local Nature Reserves in Suffolk
Alder carrs